Yorkville Community Unit School District 115 is a school district headquartered in Yorkville, Illinois, and serving portions of Kane County and Kendall County in the suburbs of Chicago. In addition to Yorkville, its service area includes Bristol, Montgomery, Oswego, and Plano.

Schools
 Yorkville High School 
 Yorkville High School Academy
 Yorkville Middle School
Elementary schools:
 Autumn Creek Elementary
 Bristol Bay Elementary
 Grande Reserve Elementary
Intermediate schools:
 Yorkville Intermediate School
Grade schools (K-3):
 Bristol Grade School
 Circle Center Grade School
 Yorkville Grade School

References

External links
 

School districts in Illinois
Education in Kane County, Illinois
Education in Kendall County, Illinois
Yorkville, Illinois
Oswego, Illinois
Plano, Illinois